Robert Van Rensselaer (December 16, 1740 – September 11, 1802) was Brigadier General during the American Revolutionary War, a member of the New York Provincial Congress from 1775 to 1777 and later a member of the New York State Assembly in the 1st, 2nd and 4th New York State Legislatures.

Early life
Robert Van Rensselaer was born December 16, 1740, at Fort Crailo in Rensselaer, New York.  He was the son of Johannes Van Rensselaer (1708–1793), and Engeltie "Angelica" Livingston (1698–1746/47).  His older siblings were Jeremiah Van Rensselaer, the 3rd Lieutenant Governor of New York, and Catherine Van Rensselaer, who married Philip Schuyler, who eventually became a United States senator from New York and was also a Federalist.

His paternal grandparents were Hendrick van Rensselaer (1667–1740), director of the Eastern patent of the Rensselaerswyck manor, and Catharina Van Brugh, daughter of merchant Johannes Pieterse Van Brugh (1624–1697). His paternal 2x great-grandfather was the merchant Killian Van Rensselaer, one of the original founders of the Dutch colony, New Amsterdam.  His maternal grandparents were Robert Livingston the Younger and Margarita Schuyler, herself the daughter of Pieter Schuyler, the first Mayor of Albany.

Career
On October 20, 1775, he was made colonel of the 8th Albany County Regiment of militia and on June 16, 1780, he was promoted to brigadier general of the second brigade of the Albany County militia.  This brigade included the Tryon County militia. He fought at Fort Ticonderoga and at the Battle of Klock's Field.

From 1775 to 1777, he was a member of the New York Provincial Congress and a member of the New York State Assembly in 1777-78, 1778-79 and 1780-81.  In 1780, Van Rensselaer negotiated a mediation with the chiefs of the Oneida Nation, Native Americans who had made an alliance with the British against the American colonists during the Revolutionary War.

Van Rensselaer was a Federalist presidential elector in 1796, and cast his votes for the eventual 2nd President of the United States, John Adams, and Thomas Pinckney, who lost the vice-presidency to Thomas Jefferson.

Personal life
On April 23, 1765, Robert married Cornelia Rutsen (1747–1790), the daughter of Colonel Jacob Rutsen and Alida Livingston on April 23, 1765, and had the following children:

 John Van Rensselaer (b. 1766), who died with no heirs.
 Jacob Rutsen Van Rensselaer (1767–1835), who married Cornelia de Peyster (1774–1849), daughter of Pierre de Peyster.
 Jeremiah Van Rensselaer (1769–1827), who married Sybil Adeline Kane (1770–1828).
 Alida Van Rensselaer (c. 1771–1799), who married Elisha Kane (1770–1834) in 1794.
 Catharine Van Rensselaer (c. 1770–1867), who married Colonel John Arent Schuyler of Belleville, New Jersey.
 Angelica Van Rensselaer (c. 1785–1818), who married Reverend Thomas Yardley How.
 Henry Van Rensselaer (b. 1775), who married Catherine D. Hoffman.
 James Van Rensselaer (1783–1840), who moved to Jasper County, Indiana and purchased land to found Rensselaer, Indiana.

Van Rensselaer died September 11, 1802, at the Van Rensselaer Lower Manor House.

Descendants
Through his daughter Alida, he was the grandfather of John Kintzing Kane (1795–1858), a noted Pennsylvania lawyer and judge who served as the Attorney General of Pennsylvania.  Kane was the father of Elisha Kent Kane (1820–1857), the explorer, Thomas Leiper Kane (1822–1883), an attorney and abolitionist, and Elizabeth Kane (1830–1869), who married Charles Woodruff Shields (1825–1904) in 1861.

See also
Van Rensselaer family

References
Notes

Sources
 Heitman, Francis B., Historical Register of Officers of the Continental Army during the War of the Revolution. New, enlarged, and revised edition., Washington, D.C.: Rare Book Shop Publishing Company, 1914

External links
 

1740 births
1802 deaths
American people of Dutch descent
Albany militia
Members of the New York Provincial Congress
Members of the New York State Assembly
Militia generals in the American Revolution
New York (state) Federalists
New York (state) militiamen in the American Revolution
1796 United States presidential electors
Robert
People from Rensselaer, New York